Leonel Ariel Miranda (born 7 January 1994 in Avellaneda, Argentina) is an Argentine professional footballer who currently plays as an midfielder for Racing Club de Avellaneda.

Career

Independiente
Miranda signed with Independiente in October 2012. He made his debut with the seven-time Copa Libertadores champions in March 2013 and made 34 appearances for the club scoring 2 goals.

On 8 January 2015 it was announced that Miranda would join Major League Soccer club Houston Dynamo on loan through to the end of the 2015 MLS season. The loan was extended for the 2016 MLS season on 30 January 2016.

Defensa y Justicia
Defensa y Justicia revealed the signing of Leonel Miranda through its social media accounts on Monday, July 25, 2016, publishing a photo of Miranda putting pen to paper.

Racing Club
In January 2020, Miranda joined Racing Club de Avellaneda on a six-months loan from Club Tijuana, with an option to buy for around 3 million dollars. After five league appearances, the buying option was automatically triggered.

References

External links 

1994 births
Living people
Sportspeople from Avellaneda
Association football midfielders
Argentine footballers
Argentine expatriate footballers
Club Atlético Independiente footballers
Houston Dynamo FC players
Defensa y Justicia footballers
Club Tijuana footballers
Racing Club de Avellaneda footballers
Argentine Primera División players
Primera Nacional players
Major League Soccer players
Liga MX players
Expatriate soccer players in the United States
Expatriate footballers in Mexico
Argentine expatriate sportspeople in the United States
Argentine expatriate sportspeople in Mexico